Friends meeting houses are places of worship for the Religious Society of Friends, or Quakers. A "meeting" is the equivalent of a church congregation, and a "meeting house" is the equivalent of a church building.

Several Friends meetings were founded in Pennsylvania in the early 1680s. The Merion Friends Meeting House is the only surviving meeting house constructed before 1700. Thirty-two surviving Pennsylvania meeting houses were constructed before 1800, and are listed individually on the National Register of Historic Places (NRHP) or as contributing properties in historic districts. More than one hundred meeting houses constructed before 1900 were documented by the Historic American Buildings Survey, and published in Silent Witness: Quaker Meeting Houses in the Delaware Valley, 1695 to the Present (2002).

One of the key tenets of the Religious Society of Friends is pacifism, adherence to the Peace Testimony. The "Free Quakers" were supporters of the American Revolutionary War, separated from the Society, and built their own meeting house in Philadelphia, at 5th & Arch Streets (1783).

In 1827, the Great Separation divided Pennsylvania Quakers into two branches, Orthodox and Hicksite. Many individual meetings also separated, but one branch generally kept possession of the meeting house. The two branches reunited in the 1950s.

Meeting houses

Demolished meeting houses

Notes

References

Further reading
Brief Historical Sketches concerning Friends' Meetings of the Past and Present with special reference to Philadelphia Yearly Meeting, compiled by T. Chalkey Matlack, Moorestown, N.J. 1938. Available at the Friends Historical Library at Swarthmore College.

See also
 List of Quaker meeting houses

External links

QuakerMeetings.com, "Monthly Meetings in North America: A Quaker Index" - a database of the history of meetings (rather than meeting houses)

 
Quaker meeting houses
Quakerism-related lists